Matías Emanuel Lequi (born 13 May 1981) is an Argentine former professional footballer who played as a central defender.

Club career
Born in Rosario, Santa Fe, Lequi started his career with hometown side Rosario Central, then signed for Club Atlético River Plate where he won two consecutive Clausura titles. In 2003 he moved abroad, joining Atlético Madrid, making his La Liga debut on 31 August in a 0–1 away loss against Sevilla FC and only missing four matches during the season as the Colchoneros eventually finished seventh and qualified for the UEFA Intertoto Cup.

Subsequently, Lequi signed with Italy's S.S. Lazio, going pretty much unnoticed during his one season-spell. For 2005–06 he returned to Spain, being loaned to RC Celta de Vigo; as the Galicians finished in sixth position and reached the UEFA Cup straight from Segunda División, he was heavily featured, scoring against Real Madrid (2–1 home defeat) and former team Atlético (opening a 3–0 away win).

After extensive negotiations, the deal with Celta was made permanent in late May 2006, for four years. Lequi suffered relegation in the first season after his purchase and, with the club already in the second level, was sent off a total of four times in the league as they languished in 16th position; he was released in August 2008.

Lequi spent the following months training on his own. In the 2009 summer transfer window, he moved to Greek side Iraklis Thessaloniki FC. On 19 January 2011, the free agent returned to Spain and signed a five-month with UD Las Palmas of the second tier.

Honours
River Plate
Argentine Primera División: Clausura 2002, 2003

References

External links

Argentine League statistics  

1981 births
Living people
Footballers from Rosario, Santa Fe
Argentine footballers
Association football defenders
Argentine Primera División players
Primera Nacional players
Rosario Central footballers
Club Atlético River Plate footballers
All Boys footballers
Aldosivi footballers
Club Atlético Sarmiento footballers
La Liga players
Segunda División players
Atlético Madrid footballers
RC Celta de Vigo players
UD Las Palmas players
Serie A players
S.S. Lazio players
Super League Greece players
Iraklis Thessaloniki F.C. players
Paraguayan Primera División players
Sportivo Luqueño players
Argentine expatriate footballers
Expatriate footballers in Spain
Expatriate footballers in Italy
Expatriate footballers in Greece
Expatriate footballers in Paraguay
Argentine expatriate sportspeople in Spain
Argentine expatriate sportspeople in Italy
Argentine expatriate sportspeople in Greece
Argentine expatriate sportspeople in Paraguay